Fritz Steuri Jr. also known as Fritz Steuri III (11 July 1908 – 8 July 1953) was a Swiss ski jumper. He competed in the individual event at the 1932 Winter Olympics.

References

External links
 

1908 births
1953 deaths
Swiss male ski jumpers
Swiss male Nordic combined skiers
Olympic ski jumpers of Switzerland
Olympic Nordic combined skiers of Switzerland
Ski jumpers at the 1932 Winter Olympics
Nordic combined skiers at the 1932 Winter Olympics
People from Grindelwald
Sportspeople from the canton of Bern